Sylvia is a 1730 ballad opera by the British writer George Lillo, written as part of a boom in ballad operas in the wake of John Gay's 1728 hit The Beggar's Opera.

The original cast included Thomas Walker as Sir John Freeman, Charles Hulett as Welford, John Hippisley as Jonathon and Jane Egleton as Betty.

References

Bibliography
 Burling, William J. A Checklist of New Plays and Entertainments on the London Stage, 1700-1737. Fairleigh Dickinson Univ Press, 1992.
 Nicoll, Allardyce. A History of Early Eighteenth Century Drama: 1700-1750. CUP Archive, 1927.

1730 operas
Ballad operas
English-language operas
Plays by George Lillo